Stephen Chan may refer to:
 Stephen Chan Chi Wan, Chief Advisor of Commercial Radio Hong Kong
 Stephen Chan OBE, Professor of International Relations in the University of London, and foundation Dean of Law and Social Sciences at the School of Oriental and African Studies (SOAS)
 Stephen Chan, Head of Revenue Management of now-defunct Oasis Hong Kong Airlines in 2008